Charles Oluf Herlofson,  (28 March 1916 – 4 December 1984) was a Norwegian naval officer. He was highly decorated for his achievements during World War II.

Personal life
Herlofson was born in Kristiania to Charles Herlofson and Ellinor Boe. He graduated as naval officer in 1939. In 1945 he married Lydia Grace Edney.

Career
During World War II he joined the Norwegian forces in the United Kingdom. He served with the Norwegian Motor Torpedo Boat flotilla at Shetland, and took part in several raids to the coast of occupied Norway. Among his war decorations were the War Cross with two Swords, the St. Olav's Medal with Oak Branch, the British  Distinguished Service Cross and the Atlantic Star, and he was twice Mentioned in dispatches.

After the war he assumed various positions in the Royal Norwegian Navy. Between 1955 and 1958 he also contributed to the development of the Ethiopian Navy. He was Officer of the American Legion of Merit, and Officer of the Ethiopian Order of Menelik II.

References

1916 births
1984 deaths
Military personnel from Oslo
Royal Norwegian Navy personnel of World War II
Royal Norwegian Navy admirals
Norwegian expatriates in Ethiopia
Recipients of the War Cross with Sword (Norway)
Recipients of the St. Olav's Medal with Oak Branch
Recipients of the Distinguished Service Cross (United Kingdom)
Foreign recipients of the Legion of Merit
Ethiopian military personnel
Recipients of orders, decorations, and medals of Ethiopia